The Ukrainian Catholic Eparchy of Chełm–Bełz (or Chełm–Bełz of the Ukrainians ) was a suffragan eparchy of the Metropolis of Kiev, Galicia and all Ruthenia in the Ruthenian Uniate Church from 1596 until 1875 and later the Ukrainian Greek Catholic Church. It was situated in the Polish–Lithuanian Commonwealth. Its cathedral, the now Latin Basilica of the Birth of the Virgin Mary, is still found in the former episcopal see of Chełm. It was forcibly suppressed in favor of Eastern Orthodoxy by the Russian Empire in May 1875 in the Conversion of Chełm Eparchy.

History 
 Established in 1596 as Diocese of Chełm–Bełz/Chelmen(sis) et Belthien(sis) Rutenorum (Latin), on Polish (or Imperial Russian) territory not previously served by the particular church.
 Suppressed by the Russian Empire on 18 March 1875 without successor.

Episcopal ordinaries

''Suffragan eparchs of Chełm–Bełz 
 Dionysius (Zbyruyskyy) (1596 – 1603)
 Arseniusz Joann (1604 – 1619)
 Atanazy Pakosta (1619 – death 1625?)
 Teodor Mieleszko (1625 – 1626)
 Metody Terlecki, Basilian Order of Saint Josaphat (O.S.B.M.) (1630 – death 7 June 1649)
 Atanazy Zachariasz Furs (1649 – death 1649)
 Jakub Jan Susza, O.S.B.M. (1652 – death 4 September 1687)
 Augustyn Aleksander Łodziata (1687 – death 1691?)
 Jan Małachowski (1691 – death 1693), previously Bishop of Przemyśl of the Ukrainians (Poland) (1670 – 1691)
 Gedeon Woyna-Orański (1693 – 1709)
 Josyf Levyckyj (1711 – death 15 June 1730)
 Felicjan Filip Wołodkowicz (Feliks Filipp Volodkovič), O.S.B.M. (1731 – 12 January 1756), next Coadjutor Archbishop of Kyiv–Halyč of the Ukrainians (Ukraine) (12 January 1756 – 18 July 1762), Eparch (Bishop) of Volodymyr–Brėst of the Ukrainians (Ukraine) (22 November 1758 – 1 February 1778), Metropolitan Archeparch (Archbishop) of Kyiv–Halyč of the Ukrainians (18 July 1762 – death 1 February 1778)
 Maksymilian Rylo, O.S.B.M. (1758–1784)
 Tadeusz Teodozy Rostocki, O.S.B.M. (2 July 1784 – 4 April 1790), next coadjutor archbishop of Kyiv–Halyč of the Ukrainians (Ukraine) (11 April 1785 – 1 November 1788), succeeding as Metropolitan Archeparch (Archbishop) of Kyiv–Halyč of the Ukrainians (Ukraine) (1 November 1788 – death 25 January 1805)
 Porfiriusz Skarbek-Ważyński (1790 – death 9 March 1804)
 Ferdynand Dąbrowa-Ciechanowski, O.S.B.M. (18 July 1810 – death 7 April 1828)
 Filip Felicjan Szumborski, O.S.B.M. (29 January 1830 – death 19 January 1851)
 Jan Teraszkiewicz (January 1851 – death 1 March 1863), succeeding as former auxiliary bishop of Chełm–Bełz of the Ukrainians (30 August 1842 – January 1851)
 Jan Mikołaj Kaliński (16 March 1863 – death 19 October 1866)
 Michał Kuzemśki (22 June 1868 – retired 1871), died 1879.

See also 
 the former Roman Catholic Diocese of Chełm(-Lublin)
 List of Catholic dioceses in Poland

References

Sources and external links 
 GCatholic - data for all sections

Chełm
Chełm–Belz
Chełm–Belz
Metropolis of Kiev, Galicia and all Ruthenia (Ruthenian Uniate Church)
Former dioceses in Europe
1596 establishments
Religious organizations established in the 1590s
16th-century establishments in Poland
Religious organizations disestablished in 1875
19th-century disestablishments in Poland
1870s disestablishments in the Russian Empire